Phu Pwint Khaing (born 23 July 1987) is a women's footballer from Myanmar who was a defender for the Myanmar women's national football team at the 2014 AFC Women's Asian Cup and 2016 AFF Women's Championship.

International goals

References

External links 
 

1987 births
Living people
Women's association football midfielders
Burmese women's footballers
Sportspeople from Yangon
Myanmar women's international footballers
Southeast Asian Games bronze medalists for Myanmar
Southeast Asian Games medalists in football
Competitors at the 2013 Southeast Asian Games
Competitors at the 2017 Southeast Asian Games